George Motz is an American television personality, historian, author and filmmaker. Motz directed a documentary film and has written books detailing the history of the hamburger in the United States. He hosted the Travel Channel show Burger Land from 2012 to 2013. He is a contributor for First We Feast with a series titled Burger Scholar Sessions.

Career 
Motz worked as a Director of Photography for WNET in New York. For his work he was a recipient of three Emmy Awards (one in 2000 and two in 2006).

Motz taught a New York University course about hamburgers.

In 2007, Motz founded The Food Film Festival based in New York City. The festival is held annually in New York City, Chicago, and Charleston.

In 2011, the festival had 160 entries and curated them to 28.

Filmography

Hamburger America 
In 2004, Motz directed a documentary film titled Hamburger America about the American hamburger and eight "iconic burger joints". A book of the same name was later released.

Burger Land (2012–2013) 
Between 2012 and 2013, Motz was the host of Burger Land on the Travel Channel.

Burger Scholar Sessions 
Motz has been a regular contributor for First We Feast since 2018.

Personal life 
Motz grew up in Long Island, New York; most notably in Garden City and West Hampton Beach. Motz lives in New York. He has two children.

Published works 
 Hamburger America: One Man's Cross-Country Odyssey to Find the Best Burgers in the Nation (2008)
 Great American Burger Book: How to Make Authentic Regional Hamburgers at Home (2016)

References 

 

Food and cooking YouTubers
Living people
Year of birth missing (living people)
Food historians